Tragocephala jucunda is a species of beetle in the family Cerambycidae. It was described by Gory in 1835, originally under the genus Lamia. It is known from South Africa and Madagascar.

Varietas
 Tragocephala jucunda var. jo Thomson, 1879
 Tragocephala jucunda var. fascicollis Breuning, 1957
 Tragocephala jucunda var. biplagiata Fairmaire, 1903
 Tragocephala jucunda var. kuenckeli Aurivillius, 1921
 Tragocephala jucunda var. heteroclita Thomson, 1857
 Tragocephala jucunda var. ochreata Fairmaire, 1894
 Tragocephala jucunda var. luctifera Fairmaire, 1905
 Tragocephala jucunda var. madagascariensis Künckel, 1890
 Tragocephala jucunda var. perrieri Fairmaire, 1903

References

jucunda
Beetles described in 1835